Dentalium glaucarena is a species of tusk shell, a marine scaphopod mollusk in the family Dentaliidae.

Distribution 
This species is endemic to the waters of New Zealand.

References

Scaphopods
Molluscs described in 1953